The 1999 Salem Open was a men's tennis tournament played on Hard courts in Hong Kong that was part of the International Series of the 1999 ATP Tour. It was the twenty-fourth edition of the tournament and was held from 5 April – 12 April.

Seeds
Champion seeds are indicated in bold text while text in italics indicates the round in which those seeds were eliminated.

Draw

Finals

Top half

Bottom half

References

Singles
Hong Kong Open (tennis)